Suruli Rajan was a Tamil film comedian/character artiste. He was a recipient of Tamil Nadu State Government's Best Comedian Award for the year 1981–82.

Biography

Suruli Rajan was born in 1938 in Periyakulam, near Theni. His father Ponnaiya Pillai worked as an accountant for farm owners of the adjoining areas in Theni. The child was named after the Surulivelar Swamy, the family deity at the temple atop a hill graced by the picturesque Suruli Falls.

Suruli Rajan lost his parents one after the other, and had to discontinue his schooling. He moved to his brother's house in Madurai and worked as an apprentice mechanic in a neighbourhood workshop. Bitten by the acting bug, he acted in several amateur stage plays in Madurai before moving to Madras in 1959 in search of greener pastures.

In spite of his passion for acting opportunities were few and far between. A sudden spate of opportunities in stage plays filled him with heartening optimism. He worked with various drama troupes, including those of O. A. K. Thevar, Pisir Ramarao, T.N. Balu and in Karunanidhi's 'kagithapoo' staged in aid of the Dravida Munnetra Kazhagam party's election fund. It was filmmaker Joseph Thaliath Jr. of The Citadel Film Corporation Pvt. Ltd who brought Suruli Rajan to cinema, first in a brief appearance in Iravum Pagalum in 1965 and soon after in a more noticeable comic role in Kathal Paduthum Padu the year following.

His friendship with T.N. Balu earned him memorable roles in blockbusters by T.R.Ramanna like Naan and Moondrezhuthu. Despite his young age Suruli Rajan was offered older roles in many of his early movies. Two other significant roles in his early years were the Madras Tamil spewing cameo in APN's Thirumalai Thenkumari (1970) and that of the devout fisherman in Aathi Parasakthi (1971). With his unique intonation and a flair for the absurd, Surulirajan rose to popularity in the late 70s.

Though at times bordering on the bawdy, he seldom failed to elicit a laugh. Suruli's brilliant portrayal of a niggardly rustic in M.A.Khaja's Maanthoppu Kiliye (1979) fetched him rare plaudits and has earned a place of pride in the annals of the immortal comedy sequences of Tamil cinema. 'It never rains, but pours' they say, and Suruli's capers had become a mandatory inclusion in most movies of the time. He created a record by acting in not less than 50 movies in a single year in 1980.

His career was cut short due to his untimely death in 1980 while he was in the peak of his career.

Filmography

References

External links 
 

Indian male comedians
Indian male film actors
Tamil comedians
Tamil male actors
Indian Tamil people
People from Theni district
1938 births
1980 deaths
20th-century Indian male actors
Male actors from Tamil Nadu
20th-century comedians